Parrhasia was a region in south Arcadia, Greece. Parrhasius, son of Lycaon gave it his name.

Today, the area corresponds to modern southwestern Arcadia, west of Megalopoli, and southeastern Elis.   The nymph of Artemis named Callisto, whom the goddess Hera made into a bear and Zeus later made into the constellation Ursa Major, was said to come from Parrhasia.  Athenaios mentions a famous beauty context there.

Ancient cities

Acacesium
Acontium
Aliphera
Basilis
Daseae
Lycosura
Macareae
Parrhasia
Phigalia — in Parrhasia, but in an isolated area on the frontier of the Messenia region, which had access to the sea and whose causes they often joined.
Proseis
Trapezus

References

External links

Perseus

 
Ancient Arcadia